Phaeodarea, or Phaeodaria, is a group of amoeboid cercozoan organisms. They are traditionally considered radiolarians, but in molecular trees do not appear to be close relatives of the other groups, and are instead placed among the Cercozoa. They are distinguished by the structure of their central capsule and by the presence of a phaeodium, an aggregate of waste particles within the cell.

The term "Radiozoa" has been used to refer to radiolaria when Phaeodarea is explicitly excluded.

Phaeodarea produce hollow skeletons composed of amorphous silica and organic material, which rarely fossilize.  The endoplasm is divided by a cape with three openings, of which one gives rise to feeding pseudopods, and the others let through bundles of microtubules that support the axopods.  Unlike true radiolarians, there are no cross-bridges between them.  They also lack symbiotic algae, generally living below the photic zone, and do not produce any strontium sulphate.

Taxonomy

Phylogeny
Through phylogenetic analyses it has been discovered that Phaeodarea is a monophyletic clade, but the historical orders and families comprising it aren't. Instead, the clade consists of 11 subclades defined by morphological and phylogenetic values that do not correspond with the traditional orders and families:

Despite this, the current taxonomy by Cavalier-Smith maintains the original classification of suborders divided between two new orders:
Eodarida, containing phaeodarea with no silica skeleton or with a skeleton made of simple radiating spicules. Contains two suborders: Phaeogymnocellina and Phaeocystina.
Opaloconchida, containing phaeodarea with a highly perforated, shell-like opaline silica skeleton. Contains the remaining five suborders: Phaeosphaeria, Phaeocalpia, Phaeogromia, Phaeoconchia and Phaeodendria.

Modern classification
The modern classification is the following, with the subclass containing a total of 2 orders, 7 suborders, 16 families and 39 genera. 

Order Eodarida 
Suborder Phaeogymnocellina (=Phaeogymnocellida) 
Family Phaeosphaeridae  – Phaeopyla, Phaeodactylis, Phaeosphaera
Family Phaeodinidae  – Phaeodina
Family Atlanticellidae  – Gymnocelia, Halocelia, Lobocelia, Miracelia, Planktonetta
Suborder Phaeocystina (=Phaeocystida) 
Family Aulacanthidae  – Aulacantha
Family Astracanthidae  – Astracantha, Castanella, Castanissa
Order Opaloconchida 
Suborder Phaeosphaeria (=Phaeocystida) 
Family Aulosphaeridae  – Aulosphaera, Aularia, Aulotractus
Family Cannosphaeridae  – Coelocantha
Family Sagosphaeridae  – Sagenoarium, Sagenoscena, Sagoscena
Suborder Phaeocalpia (=Phaeocalpida) 
Family Castanellidae  – Castanea
Family Circoporidae  – Circoporus, Circospathis, Haeckeliana
Family Tuscaroridae  – Tuscarora, Tuscarilla, Tuscaretta
Family Porospathidae  – Porospathis
Family Polypyramidae  – Polypyramis
Suborder Phaeogromia (=Phaeogromida) 
Family Challengeridae  – Challengeria, Challengeron
Family Medusettiidae  – Euphysetta, Gazelletta, Medusetta
Family Lirellidae  – Borgertella, Lirella
Suborder Phaeoconchia (=Phaeoconchida) 
Family Concharidae  – Conchidium
Suborder Phaeodendria (=Phaeodendrida) 
Family Coelodendridae  – Coelodendrum, Coelographis

References

 
Cercozoa classes
Amoeboids
Taxa named by Ernst Haeckel